Thiofanox is a chemical compound used in acaricides and insecticides.

References

External links

Acetylcholinesterase inhibitors
Insecticides
Acaricides
Carbamate insecticides
Oxime carbamates
Tert-butyl compounds